O'Flanagan is an Irish surname. Notable people with the name include:

 Kevin O'Flanagan (1919–2006), Irish former sportsman, physician and sports administrator
 Michael O'Flanagan (1876–1942), Irish Republican and Roman Catholic priest
 Mick O'Flanagan (1922–2015), Irish former soccer and rugby union international
 Patrick O'Flanagan (born 1947), Irish geographer and academic
 Robert Dermot O'Flanagan (1901–1972), U.S. Catholic bishop
 Sheila O'Flanagan (born 1958), Irish fiction writer and journalist who currently writes for the Irish Times

See also 
 With v O'Flanagan, an English contract law case concerning misrepresentation